Fritz Frauenheim (9 January 1912 – 28 September 1969) was a German U-boat commander of the Second World War. He was a recipient of the Knight's Cross of the Iron Cross of Nazi Germany.

Early life
Frauenheim was born in Berlin-Friedenau on 9 March 1912. He entered the navy and spent his initial training on the cadet ship , followed by a period on the light cruiser Karlsruhe. He was transferred to the U-boat force in January 1936 and rose quickly through the ranks and on 1 April 1939 he was promoted to Kapitänleutnant. He appears to have spent time with the German forces supporting the Spanish Nationalist forces during the Spanish Civil War, as he was awarded the Spanish Cross on 6 June 1939.

Wartime career
He was appointed to command  on 1 October 1937, eventually carrying out five patrols, eventually sinking four merchant ships. He also laid mines, one of which damaged  on 21 November, putting her out of action for nearly three years. The  Bayonet was sunk by one of U-21’s mines on 21 December.

Frauenheim left U-21 on 6 January 1940, taking over command of the newly built  on 11 March 1940. He commissioned the boat and took her on four successful patrols. He sank a total of 12 ships, including three sunk and one damaged from convoy SC 7. He left U-101 on 18 November 1940 and became a teacher in the 2nd ULD. He went on to hold a number of staff positions, before taking command of 23rd U-boat Flotilla in the Mediterranean in September 1941. In 1942 he moved to command 29th U-boat Flotilla. On 1 March 1943 he was promoted to Korvettenkapitän. In February 1944 Frauenheim joined the staff of the Admiral der Kleinkampfverbände (Admiral of Small Battle Units), where he remained for the rest of the war. He was again promoted, this time to Fregattenkapitän on 1 December 1944.

Post war
After the end of the war Frauenheim spent eight months in Allied captivity before being released. Frauenheim for almost 20 years until his death worked at the Mobil Oil AG in the Federal Republic of Germany. His last position was a member of the board and head of the department of Marine Transportation and Pipelines. He died in Hamburg on 28 September 1969, aged 57.

Awards
Wehrmacht Long Service Award 4th Class (2 October 1936)
Spanish Cross in Bronze (6 June 1939)
Iron Cross (1939)
 2nd Class (2 October 1939)
 1st Class (7 November 1939)
Sudetenland Medal (20 December 1938)
Knight's Cross of the Iron Cross on 29 August 1940 as Kapitänleutnant and commander of U-101
Knight's Cross of the Order of the Roman Eagle with Swords (18 June 1943)
German Cross in Gold on 23 November 1944 as Korvettenkapitän with the Admiral of the Kleinkampfverbände

Promotions

References

Citations

Bibliography

 
 
 
 

1912 births
1969 deaths
Military personnel from Berlin
U-boat commanders (Kriegsmarine)
People from the Province of Brandenburg
Recipients of the Knight's Cross of the Iron Cross
German military personnel of the Spanish Civil War
Recipients of the Gold German Cross
Reichsmarine personnel
People from Tempelhof-Schöneberg